Unax Ugalde Gutiérrez (born 27 November 1978) is a Spanish-Basque actor.

Early life
Unax Ugalde Gutiérrez was born on 27 November 1978, in Vitoria-Gasteiz, Basque Country. He is the son of a worker at the Altos Hornos and a housewife. While a student, he had the ambition of becoming a marine scientist and started taking interpretation classes. In order to pay for his studies, he worked in a supermarket where he dressed up as a chocolate ball. He got his very first job in a TV series named Entre dos fuegos for ETB basque television. In 1999, he left the Basque Country to start an acting career in Madrid.

Personal life 
From 2005 to 2012, Unax Ugalde was in a relationship with the actress Ingrid Rubio.

On 14 October 2018, he married the journalist Neus Cerdá, the actor Asier Etxeandía officiated the wedding. On 27 August 2018, the couple's first child, a boy, was born whom they called Ondei Ugalde Cerdá. On 3 January 2021, the couple's second child, a boy, was born whom they called Marc Ugalde Cerdá.

Career 

He made his debut in the cinema in Fill Me with Life. He then featured in Volverás (2002), playing a good student who is about to leave home, when he met his criminal brother (Tristán Ulloa), thus leaving the "right way" and trying to help him to reach emotional maturity during a night. In that year, 2002, Ugalde had a supporting role in the film Bellas durmientes by Eloy Lozano. And year later, 2003, Ugalde starred in the controversial film Diario de una becaria by Josecho San Mateo, director of Ugalde's first film.

That year, he was about to premiere Equus in theatre, playing same role for which Peter Firth was nominated for an Oscar: a young aggressive, on the brink of madness, with a great fear of the outside world (similar to the teenager who played in El grupo) who is overcome by shyness and emotional instability. Finally the work was suspended.

However, this failed attempt highlighted the fact that Unax Ugalde was specializing in violent youth with a good heart, as he plays the role of Gorilo in Héctor (Gracia Querejeta, 2004). That year the director Paul Malo, with whom he had worked on a short film, offered him starring in Frío sol de invierno. Two months after the release of the latter, Unax Ugalde received a nomination for the Goya Awards for his performance in Héctor as well as a new nomination in the Unión de Actores Awards.

In 2005, he premiered Queens, in which he went into the skin of a man about to marry his boyfriend (Daniel Hendler) in the Spanish first gay wedding and could not support his castrating mother, who will deliberately lose her dog in order to make impossible a normal life for the couple. In his next film, Alatriste, he played the son of a fellow of Viggo Mortensen who died in Flanders. While recording he received the news that Daniel Brühl was to play Salvador Puig Antich in Salvador, to the detriment of his own candidacy.

When he completed his role in Alatriste, Unax Ugalde recorded his third international film, this time in English. Miloš Forman asked him to play the brother of Natalie Portman in Goya's Ghosts along with Javier Bardem, Randy Quaid, Stellan Skarsgård, Eusebio Lázaro, Blanca Portillo, José Luis Gómez, Andrés Gértrudix and Fernando Tielve.

He combined the filming of his last two works with the promotion of Shooting Star which led him, among other places, to the Berlin Film Festival and in 2005 to the Festival of Seville.

In 2006, before premiering Alatriste, he filmed with Julianne Moore, Savage Grace, playing one of Tony Bakeland's lovers. In 2007, he played a young Florentino Ariza in the film adaptation of the book Love in the Time of Cholera. Then he starred in La buena nueva, in which he plays a priest who spends the Spanish Civil War in the navarrese town of Alsasua and who will witness with horror the atrocities being committed in the name of religion. In this movie, Ugalde stars with Guillermo Toledo and fellow Basque actress Barbara Goenaga, among others and is directed by Helena Taberna.

In 2008, Ugalde played the role of Roberto "El Vaquerito" Rodríguez in Che Part 1: The Argentine, the first part of the two-parts biopic about Ernesto "Che" Guevara film, Che. The film is an American superproduction inspired about Ernesto "Che" Guevara's life during Cuban Revolution and directed by Steven Soderbergh. In 2010, Ugalde filmed three movies: Cefalópodo directed by Rubén Imaz, a Mexican film about overcoming of break-up in a couple; Bon Appétit opera prima was directed by David Pinillos, the film was shot in Zurich (Switzerland) and filmed in English, in addition the film won Goya Award for Best New Director; and finally No controles directed by Borja Cobeaga, Pagafantas`s director.

In 2011, Ugalde premiered two films. The first film is There Be Dragons, the film was directed by Roland Joffé and it is based on Josemaría Escrivá de Balaguer's life, catholic priest and founder of Opus Dei. The film has been the best second of Spanish cinema on its first week-end, the record goes to Torrente 4; the second film is Tequila: Historia de una pasión by Sergio Sánchez Suárez, Ugalde's second raid in Mexican cinema. A part, Ugalde has shot scenes for a play called Olaguílbe 1808 by Patxi Basabe, in this play there are scenes filmed because they want interaction between watchers and the play. In addition, Ugalde stars in Baztan by Iñaki Elizalbe, Spanish film that's shooting in Basque. Baztan had its premiere in 60th San Sebastián International Film Festival, the film garnered positive reviews and critical acclaim. Finally, in december Ugalde premiered TV film El asesinato de Carrero Blanco in ETB and 2012 in TVE.

In 2012, Ugalde starred in Dracula, a horror film directed by Dario Argento, shooting in 3D and in English, Ugalde plays Jonathan Harker, one of the main protagonists. Dracula was shown in 65th Cannes Film Festival and the film was greeted with largely mixed reviews from professional film critics. Next year, Ugalde shot two films. The first is Bypass, Ugalde's second raid in Basque language; the other film is Somos gente honrada. In addition, Ugalde joined the cast of the 3rd season of the drama series Gran Reserva.

Work

Filmography

Short films

Television 
 Periodistas
 A las once en casa
 El grupo
 7 vidas
 Compañeros (1 episode)
 LEX (2008)
 Cuéntame cómo pasó
 Gran Reserva
 La valla
Amar es Para Siempre ( Season 9)
Ana Tramel
The Black Castle

Play 
Olaguílbe 1808

Prizes 
Goya Awards

Spanish Actor's Guild

Fotogramas de Plata

Malaga Film Festival

Ourense Film Festival

Viña del Mar Film Festival

Turia Prize

Bogart Prize
 Best Basque actor (2001)

Gaztea Sariak
 Best actor (2000)

References

External links 
 

Spanish male film actors
Male actors from the Basque Country (autonomous community)
1978 births
Spanish male television actors
Living people
21st-century Spanish male actors
People from Vitoria-Gasteiz
Basque-language actors